, also known as , (roughly translated as "prepared alive") is the preparing of sashimi (raw fish) from live seafood. In this Japanese culinary technique, the most popular sea animal used is fish, but octopus, shrimp, and lobster may also be used. The practice is controversial owing to concerns about the animal's suffering, as it is still alive when served.

Preparation and serving
The restaurant may have one or several tanks of live sea animals for a customer to choose from. There are different styles in which a chef may serve the dish but the most common way is to serve it on a plate with the filleted meat assembled on top of the body.

Ikizukiri fish may be prepared with only three knife cuts by the chef. They are usually presented with the head still whole so that customers are able to see the continuing gill movements.

Legality
Ikizukuri is outlawed in Australia and Germany.

See also 
 Eating live seafood
 Pain in fish
 Pain in crustaceans
 Odorigui, the consumption of live seafood while it is still moving
 Yin Yang fish

References

External links 
 
 

Japanese cuisine
Animal-based seafood
Dishes involving the consumption of live animals
Uncooked fish dishes